Christoph Daferner (born 12 January 1998) is a German professional footballer who plays as a forward for  club 1. FC Nürnberg.

Career
Daferner made his professional debut for SC Freiburg in the Bundesliga on 21 April 2019, coming on as a substitute in the 65th minute for Florian Niederlechner in the home match against Borussia Dortmund. On 7 August 2020, Dynamo Dresden announced that Daferner has signed a three-year contract with the club.

On 28 June 2022, Daferner signed with 1. FC Nürnberg.

References

External links
 
 Profile at kicker.de
 

1998 births
Living people
People from Aichach-Friedberg
Sportspeople from Swabia (Bavaria)
Footballers from Bavaria
German footballers
Germany youth international footballers
Association football forwards
TSV 1860 Munich II players
SC Freiburg II players
SC Freiburg players
FC Erzgebirge Aue players
Dynamo Dresden players
1. FC Nürnberg players
Bundesliga players
2. Bundesliga players
3. Liga players
Regionalliga players